Greenland Township is one of thirty-seven townships in Washington County, Arkansas, USA. As of the 2020 census, its total population was 1,213.

Geography

Cities, towns, villages
Greenland

Cemeteries

The township contains Boone Cemetery, Rieff Chapel Cemetery, Shaeffer Cemetery, Baptist Ford (Union) Cemetery, and Wilson Cemetery.

Major routes
  Interstate 49
  U.S. Route 71
  Arkansas Highway 265

References

 United States Census Bureau 2008 TIGER/Line Shapefiles
 United States National Atlas

External links
 US-Counties.com
 City-Data.com

Townships in Washington County, Arkansas
Townships in Arkansas